Logan Township is the name of some places in the U.S. state of Michigan:

 Logan Township, Mason County, Michigan
 Logan Township, Ogemaw County, Michigan
 Adrian Township, Michigan in Lenawee County was originally named Logan Township

A few places in Michigan were once named Logan:
 The original plat for Adrian, Michigan was recorded under the name of "Logan"
 A community in Bowne Township, Michigan in Kent County had a post office named "Logan", 1884-1888 and 1899-1906
 A community in Livingston Township, Michigan in Otsego County had a post office named "Logan", 1880-1883

See also
 Logan Township (disambiguation)

Michigan township disambiguation pages